The Office of Transportation Cooperatives (OTC) is a government agency of the Philippines mandated to promulgate and implement rules and regulations that governs the promotion, organization, regulation, supervision, registration through accreditation and development of transportation cooperatives which are subject to the approval of the Department of Transportation. It is created through Executive Order No. 898, signed by then President Ferdinand Marcos on May 28, 1983.

OTC is headed by a chairman and an executive director. The office is further subdivided into the Administrative & Finance Division, Operations Division, and Planning & Evaluation Division.

References

 Department of Transportation (Philippines)
 Transportation organizations based in the Philippines
 Cooperatives in the Philippines
1983 in the Philippines
Establishments by Philippine executive order